Miss Universe 2006 was the 55th Miss Universe pageant, held at the Shrine Auditorium in Los Angeles, California, United States on July 23, 2006. 

At the end of the event, Natalie Glebova of Canada crowned Zuleyka Rivera of Puerto Rico as Miss Universe 2006. It is Puerto Rico's fifth victory in the pageant's history. After the show, Rivera passed out but quickly recovered.

Contestants from 86 countries and territories competed in this year's pageant, surpassing the previous record of 84 contestants in 1999. The pageant was hosted by Carlos Ponce and Nancy O'Dell, with Queer Eye's Carson Kressley and Miss USA 2004 Shandi Finnessey providing commentary and analysis throughout the event. American singer-rapper Chelo and Italian operatic tenor Vittorio Grigolo performed in this year's pageant.

Background

Location and date 
Due to the lack of interest of several cities from hosting the pageant, the Miss Universe Organization decided to hold the pageant in July instead of May. The Miss Universe Organization confirmed that the 2006 edition will be held at the Shrine Auditorium in Los Angeles, California on July 23, 2006. It is the first time in eight years that pageant took place in the United States. The last time that the United States hosted the pageant was in 1998 in Honolulu, Hawaii.

Selection of participants 
Contestants from 86 countries and territories were selected to compete in the pageant. One delegate was appointed to her position after being a runner-up of her national pageant, while another was selected to replace the original dethroned winner.

Gao Ying Hui, the first runner-up of Miss Universe China 2006, was appointed to represent China at Miss Universe after Qi Fang, Miss Universe China 2006, was dethroned after violating the rules in her contract.

The 2006 edition saw the debut of Kazakhstan, and the returns of Argentina, the Cayman Islands, Estonia, Ghana, Iceland, New Zealand, the Northern Mariana Islands, Saint Lucia, Saint Vincent and the Grenadines, Sint Maarten, and Sweden. Saint Lucia last competed in 1977, Iceland last competed in 1997, Sint Maarten last competed in 2000, the Northern Mariana Islands last competed in 2002, Argentina and New Zealand last competed in 2003, while the others last competed in 2004. Barbados, Belize, Curaçao, Italy, Kenya, the Netherlands, and Vietnam withdrew after their respective organizations failed to hold a national competition or appoint a delegate.

Silva Shahakian of Iraq was set to compete at Miss Universe. However, Shahakian withdrew after hiding from Islamic militants who reportedly threatened to kill her along with other contestants who competed in the Miss Iraq pageant.

Results

Placements

Special awards

Pageant

Format 
The Miss Universe Organization introduced several specific changes to the format for this edition. The number of semifinalists was increased to 20 instead of the traditional 15. This is due to the host city not paying for the promotion, which spared the telecast by seven minutes. 20 semifinalists were chosen through the preliminary competition— composed of the swimsuit and evening gown competitions and closed-door interviews. The top 20 competed in the swimsuit competition and were narrowed down to the top 10 afterward. The top 10 competed in the evening gown competition and were narrowed down to the top 5 afterward.

Selection committee

Final telecast 
 James Lesure – Actor from NBC's Las Vegas
 Claudia Jordan – Model for Deal or No Deal; former Miss Rhode Island USA and Miss Rhode Island Teen USA
 Sean Yazbeck – Winner of season 5 of The Apprentice
 Amelia Vega – Miss Universe 2003 from Dominican Republic
 Emmitt Smith – Former Dallas Cowboys player and Dancing with the Stars winner
 Marc Cherry – American writer and producer
 Tom Green – Actor and comedian
 María Celeste Arrarás – Telemundo host
 Patrick McMullan – Fashion photographer
 Bridgette Wilson – Miss Teen USA 1990 from Oregon
 Santino Rice – Project Runway finalist

Note: Actress Bo Derek was scheduled to be a judge but was later replaced.

Contestants 
86 contestants competed for the title.

Notes

References

External links
 Miss Universe official website

2006
2006 in the United States
2006 beauty pageants
Beauty pageants in the United States
2006 in California
Events in Los Angeles
July 2006 events in the United States